The 1951–52 NCAA men's ice hockey season began in November 1951 and concluded with the 1952 NCAA Men's Ice Hockey Tournament's championship game on March 15, 1952 at the Broadmoor Ice Palace in Colorado Springs, Colorado. This was the 5th season in which an NCAA ice hockey championship was held and is the 58th year overall where an NCAA school fielded a team.

This was the first season of play for the MCHL. The conference was the first for western teams and would eventually become the WCHA.

Regular season

Season tournaments

Standings

1952 NCAA Tournament

Player stats

Scoring leaders
The following players led the league in points at the conclusion of the season.

GP = Games played; G = Goals; A = Assists; Pts = Points; PIM = Penalty minutes

Leading goaltenders
The following goaltenders led the league in goals against average at the end of the regular season while playing at least 33% of their team's total minutes.

GP = Games played; Min = Minutes played; W = Wins; L = Losses; OT = Overtime/shootout losses; GA = Goals against; SO = Shutouts; SV% = Save percentage; GAA = Goals against average

Awards

NCAA

MCHL
No Awards

References

External links
College Hockey Historical Archives
1951–52 NCAA Standings

 
NCAA